The 1956 Tourist Trophy may refer to the following races:
 The 1956 Isle of Man TT, for Grand Prix Motorcycles
 The 1956 Dutch TT, for Grand Prix Motorcycles held at Assen
 The 1956 Australian Tourist Trophy, for sports cars held at Albert Park